Mandy Zieren (born 1978-10-09) is an Australian bodyboarder competing on the International Bodyboarding Association World Tour.

Zieren, a resident of Avalon, New South Wales has won five Australian bodyboard titles and has been ranked as high as third in the world bodyboard rankings.

External links
ABC profile
Fluid zone profile

Living people
1978 births
Bodyboarders
Australian female surfers